Summer learning loss or summer slide, is the loss of academic skills and knowledge over the course of summer vacation in countries that have lengthy breaks in the school year, such as the US and Canada. Schools see evidence of this because students are often given a standardised test prior to the summer break and again when they return to school in the autumn.

Research studies produce different results as to the extent of the loss, however they all appear to agree that the loss in learning varies across age and grade, subject matter, and family income and socioeconomic status. In 2017, one review of the research in the U.S.A. concluded that a) on average students lost one month of learning over the summer months, b) losses were higher for maths as compared to reading, c) higher grade levels experienced more loss, d) the income-learning gap was especially significant because middle-class students tended to show an improvement in reading skills during the summer while lower-income students tended to experience a loss in reading skills (there was not a similar gap with respect to maths), and e) there was no difference by gender or race in either subject.

Summer programs 

After-school activities and summer programs can play a role in combating summer learning loss. Studies have shown that if students are able to participate in organised academic activities during the summer months, they are less likely to experience the losses in academic skills and knowledge before the start of the next school year.

Inexpensive reading programs that reduce summer reading loss among low-income or at-risk students include giving kids books that interest them. While some programs produce good results, there is a concern that the results will not last unless at-risk students receive extra support during the school year.

Gap and summer learning loss

Mathematics 
Students score lower on standardised maths tests at the end of the summer, as compared to their own performance on the same tests at the beginning of summer.  This loss was most acute in factual and procedural learning such as mathematical computation, where an average setback of more than two months of grade-level equivalency was observed among both middle- and lower-class students.

Reading 
In reading and language, however, substantial differences were found between middle-class and lower-class students.  Whereas middle-class students showed a non-significant gain in reading scores, lower-class students showed a significant loss that represented a gap of about three months of grade-level equivalent reading skills between middle- and lower-class students.

These results are consistent with other researchers' findings that a family's socioeconomic status affects children's achievement scores almost exclusively when school is closed.  Barbara Heyns’ 1978 landmark study of 2,978 6th and 7th graders in the Atlanta city public schools was the first thorough investigation of summer learning.  Heyns found that while poor children and black children came close to keeping up with middle-class children in cognitive growth when school was in session, they lagged far behind during the summer.

Researchers Doris Entwistle and Karl Alexander extended Barbara Heyns’ line of research through the Beginning School Study (BSS) in 1982. BSS compared the school-year and summer achievement gains of 790 youths across 20 of Baltimore's public schools  from the beginning of first grade in 1982 through the end of elementary school. The study also tracked these students' progress through high school and college.  They found that in year nine, the low-socioeconomic status (SES) group's Reading Comprehension average lagged 73 points behind the high-SES group's on the California Achievement Test (CAT-V).  About a third of the 73 points' difference (27 points) was in place when the students started first grade. After the first grade, the low-SES students fall further behind each year, with the gap reaching a plateau of around 70 points in the 5th grade. The remaining two-thirds of the 73 point gap accumulate over the course of the elementary and middle school years, with a staggering 48.5 points being attributed to the cumulative summer learning gap from the five elementary years.  As this data shows, virtually the entire achievement gap reflects differences between low-SES and high-SES students’ home environments, with cognitive gains during the school year being relatively equal between both groups.

Researchers from The Ohio State University extended summer learning gap research further by conducting a national study of 17,000 kindergarten and first grade children from the Early Childhood Longitudinal Study.  The authors confirmed earlier findings of an unequal starting point, showing that a standard deviation's advantage in SES  predicts a 1.77 month advantage in initial reading skill on the first day of kindergarten.  The authors also confirmed that the SES achievement gap continues to grow after schooling starts, with summer learning accounting for the vast majority of the difference.  While the average kindergarten learning rate was 1.65 test points per month, a standard deviation's advantage in SES predicted a relative gain of 0.16 points per month during summer, 0.07 points per month during kindergarten, and 0.05 points per month during first grade.

Magnitude of the problem 

The United States has a K-12 public school enrolment roughly 48 million, of which only 9.2 percent attend summer school programs.  These summer school programs typically differ significantly from the regular school program in terms of curriculum, goals and rigour.  Because summer school programs are voluntary, self-selection also confounds the effects of attending.  Due to these differences, most summer school programs have not been effective in reducing the achievement gap between low-SES and high-SES youth, and in some cases actually exacerbate the gaps.  For those low-SES students who do not have access to high quality summer learning opportunities, the personal impact is significant.

The early learning gap among low-SES students, which is predominantly driven by summer learning loss in the elementary school years, casts a long achievement shadow.  When compared to high-SES youth, the low-SES youth are “more likely to enter adulthood without high school certification (36 percent versus 3 percent at age twenty-two) and less likely to attend a four-year college (7 percent versus 59 percent, also at age twenty-two)."  The college wage premium doubled from 1967 to 1997, while the dropout penalty similarly doubled.  In an economy that is increasingly unaccommodating of low-skill workers, joblessness and declining wages are related to growth in ghetto poverty.  In characterising the U.S. poverty population, John Iceland revealed that “poor African-American children are less likely to escape poverty than others – 1 in 3 were still poor at ages 25 to 27, as compared to 1 in 12 white children."  While no consensus has been reached on a model to explain this lack of mobility, some research has provided the strongest support for the economic resources model, “where parents’ lack of money and time hinders the ability to invest in children's education."  The correlation between SES and educational attainment thus has significant implications for the likelihood of low-SES children escaping poverty.

Vulnerable learners 

Cooper's (1996) study (as cited in Graham, McNamara and VanLankveld, 2011, pg.575) indicates that the gap in the learning cycle which occurs during summer vacation is more prominent for children that are less advantaged.  Children who are the most susceptible are those from lower socioeconomic backgrounds, ethnic minorities and students with exceptionalities (Graham, 2011; Guryan & Kim, 2010; & Kim, 2006). Further, it is predominantly literacy related skills that are affected the most (Graham,2011).

In a study conducted by Kim (2006) an intervention was designed to provide children with effective summer learning experiences and to improve the reading abilities of minority student's and struggling readers. The results of the study indicate that the most significant reading gains occurred for disadvantaged students while students from middle to high socio-economic upbringings remained stable on standardised measures of reading (Kim, 2006). However, such findings are not consistent with a recent review by Guryan and Kim (2010) whereby a summer reading intervention was implemented for low-income Latino children. Low-income parents often lack the resources to provide children with sufficient reading materials needed to reinforce important literacy skills. Further children who are English language learners need additional exposure to print material, which may be difficult for children in homes where English is not the native language (Guryan and Kim, 2010).

This study concludes by suggesting that family literacy interventions focusing primarily on training parents do not reliably improve child outcomes; and a more effective approach would be to train both parents and children in a summer reading program.

High-achieving students are much less affected than others by the school year.  High-achieving students maintain approximately the same steady rate of skill growth regardless of whether school is in session, whereas average students grow faster during the school year and plateau during the summer.

Parental involvement 

The majority of the literature which examines the effects of the summer learning loss lends to the importance of involving families in the implementation of summer reading programs. Graham, McNamara and Van Lankveld (2011) conducted a summer literacy program to address specific literacy needs of young children which also required the involvement of caregivers in program delivery. Children as well as caregivers attended literacy skill building workshops where instructional sessions were tailored towards both children and parents, as well as include a collaborative component.  Based on the analysis of pre-test and post-test data collected during the study, children demonstrated significant improvements in developing their literacy skills (Graham, 2011).

Timmons (2008) also identifies the importance of providing literacy education to parents and children, while also bringing them together to work collaboratively in group situations. The active involvement of caregivers in their child's educational career only enhances academic achievement, as research indicates the significant influence that family involvement has on successful student outcomes (Timmons, 2008).  Effective summer reading programs provide families with meaningful strategies and resources that can be carried over and implemented in their home, which ensures continuity of summer reading programs throughout year, after the intervention has concluded (Timmons, 2008).

Canada

The Council of Ontario Directors of Education (CODE) published the results of their study entitled The Ontario Summer Literacy Learning Project 2010. Its purpose was to offer a Summer Literacy Learning Program during the summer of 2010, to over 1,100 primary students in 28 Ontario Boards, and determine its effect.

The components of these programs varied widely (e.g. the total days from 8 to 29 and the total hours in a day from 3 to 7). Generally speaking, the programs slowed learning loss. However, nine of the English boards fell into two groups, those that gained literacy skills or those that closed literacy gaps. Of those nine, there was also a lot of variation in terms of the number of days (10 to 20 days), the total hours in a day (3 to 7.5 hours), the instructional hours (2 to 4 hours), and the recreational hours (0 to 4 hours). Despite this variance, the report concluded that, between the two groups, the number of days, hours of the program and hours devoted to instruction or recreation were not statistically significant.

Subsequently, in 2014 CODE published a Program Planning Guide to help Boards implement summer learning programs (SLP). After three years of delivering the SLP, they concluded that the programs a) make a difference for students experiencing literacy challenges, b) minimise summer learning losses, and c) in many cases, increase literacy achievements.

Some of the deliverables and expectations of the programs are a) students are in grades K-3, b) classes have no fewer than 15 students, c) programs offer a minimum of 45 hours of high quality and engaging literacy or numeracy instruction, and include a recreational component (e.g. physical activity, drama, art and music), and d) employ qualified teachers to instruct the students.

In recent years the project has included both French and English classes, blended literacy & numeracy, robotics, coding, student mentors, Indigenous activities and English Language Learning. In 2018, 10,000 students participated in Ontario, most programs were three weeks long and funding was allocated at $10,000 per class.  Reports on the project can be found here.

See also

 National Summer Learning Association
 Summer school
 Special education
 Summer camp
 Outdoor education
 Experiential learning
 Extended School Year
 Year-round school in the United States
 After-school activity

Further reading

References

Learning
Summer